Gregorio Sena Manterola (8 September 1890 – 22 May 1956) was a Spanish footballer who played as a midfielder for Real Sociedad and Athletic Club. His brothers Alfonso and Miguel also played for Real Sociedad.

Biography
Born in San Sebastián, he began his career in 1909 at his local club Real Sociedad, which had just been founded by, among others, his two older brothers. At the time, the teams who had not been legally registered for more than a year could not play official matches, and therefore, in order to play in the 1910 Copa del Rey, they borrowed the license from Vasconia de San Sebastián, under whose name they competed and reached the final, which they lost 0–1 to Athletic Club.

In 1912, he joined RCD Espanyol, but after a brief successful spell he returned to Sociedad where he played until 1916, when he decided to retire at the age of 26. However, he reversed his decision and returned to Sociedad two years later, in 1918, and after a great season with the club, he was signed by Athletic Club in 1919, making his competitive debut on 10 December 1919 in a draw 1–1 with SD Erandio. He then helped the club win the 1919–20 North championship, hence qualifying for the 1920 Copa del Rey. He featured in the final alongside the likes of Domingo Acedo, Pichichi and José María Belauste, but still they were beaten by FC Barcelona. He retired for good shortly after.

Honours
Real Sociedad
Copa del Rey: Runner-up 1910

Athletic Club
Copa del Rey: Runner-up 1920

References

1890 births
1956 deaths
Spanish footballers
Association football midfielders
Footballers from San Sebastián
Real Sociedad footballers
Athletic Bilbao footballers
RCD Espanyol footballers